SM Delgado is a department store owned by SM Land Inc. and operated by Metro Manila Shopping Mecca Corporation, the same arm of the SM Group that operate the branches at SM City Manila and SM City Santa Rosa. It is the oldest SM store in the Philippines outside Metro Manila. It is located within Iloilo City's commercial district along Delgado and Valeria Streets. It first opened in May 1979 and was relaunched in December 2004. It is the forth SM Department Store built by Henry Sy Sr. and the first branch opened outside Metro Manila. SM Supermarket was conceptualized and opened its store at SM Delgado in 1985. The mall was relaunched in 2004.

History 
The original edifice was demolished on February 2, 2004 and a new building was built on the same vicinity that was opened to the public on December 8, 2004. In 2007, an annex building was added to complete the shopping center's redevelopment. SM Delgado was originally known as SM Iloilo prior to the opening of SM City Iloilo on June 11, 1999.

References

External links
SM Department Stores. Official website.
SM Prime Holdings. The official website of the parent company.
SM Supermarket. The official website of SM Supermarket

Shopping malls in Iloilo City
SM Prime
Department store buildings in the Philippines
Shopping malls established in 1979
Buildings and structures in Iloilo City